Søren Hjorth (13 October 1801, in Vesterbygaard at Kalundborg in the west of Zealand (Denmark) – 28 August 1870, in Copenhagen) was a Danish railway pioneer and inventor. Before Werner von Siemens, he discovered the dynamo-electric principle in 1854 and received the first patent for a self-excited dynamo.

Sources 
 Søren Hjorth, inventor of the dynamo-electric principle; by Sigurd Smith. Pub. by "Elektroteknisk forening" at the expense of the Carlsberg foundation. (1912)

Danish engineers
19th-century Danish inventors
1801 births
1870 deaths